Rebecca M. Puhl is a researcher in the field of weight bias.

Biography 
Puhl received her bachelor's degree from Queen's University in Canada in 1999. She then attended Yale University, where she received her master's degree in Psychology in 2001 and her Ph.D. in Clinical Psychology in 2004. She is a professor in the Department of Human Development and Family Sciences and deputy director of the Rudd Center for Food Policy and Health at the University of Connecticut. 

Puhl's research focuses on weight-based bullying, discrimination and bias. Furthermore, she examines the health effects of weight bias  and works to develop evidence-based training programs to reduce its effects.  Additionally, she routinely testifies in state legislative hearings on weight bias. 

Throughout the course of her career, Puhl has authored over 170 peer-reviewed studies and been cited over 32,000 times. This work led to her being named to a list of the world's most highly cited researchers in 2021. 

In 2018, Puhl was the recipient of The Obesity Society Scientific Achievement Award, which recognizes excellence in an established research career.  In 2021, she was the recipient of the Distinguished Lecturer Award for Obesity Canada.

References 

Yale University alumni
Queen's University at Kingston alumni
University of Connecticut faculty
Year of birth missing (living people)
Living people
Canadian psychologists